Vranduk is an abandoned village in the municipality of Doboj, Bosnia and Herzegovina. According to the preliminary results of the Bosnian census of 2013, while there are still 5 dwellings, it apparently no longer has any inhabitants. In 1991 it had a population of 199, 98% of which were Croats. The Yugoslavian censuses of 1971 and 1981 counted 167 and 224 inhabitants respectively.

Historical Population

References

Villages in Republika Srpska
Doboj
Former populated places in Bosnia and Herzegovina